Runyan v. State, 57 Ind. 80 (1877), was an Indiana court case that argued natural law and a distinct American Mind to reject a duty to retreat when claiming self-defense in a homicide case.

Background
On election night for the 1876 presidential race, John Runyan was harassed for being a Democrat by Charles Presnall when they were both in New Castle, Indiana. Runyan shot and killed him with his revolver even though he could have retreated.

Decision
The court implied it was un-American, writing of a referring to the distinct American mind, "the tendency of the American mind seems to be very strongly against" a duty to retreat. The court went further in saying that no statutory law could require a duty to retreat, because the right to stand one's ground is "founded on the law of nature; and is not, nor can it be, superseded by any law of society."

References

Indiana state case law
Self-defense
1877 in United States case law
New Castle, Indiana
1876 United States presidential election